The Diamond DA62 is a five- to seven-seat, twin-engine light aircraft produced by Diamond Aircraft Industries and first announced in March 2012.

The prototype, designated as the DA52, first flew on 3 April 2012 after six months of development. In June 2014 it was announced the production aircraft would be designated the DA62.

Design and development 
The DA62 development team is headed by Diamond managing director Manfred Zipper. It is based upon the fuselage of the single-engine Diamond DA50, but with two Austro AE300 Diesel engines burning Jet A fuel. Company CEO Christian Dries indicated that the engines may be replaced with turboprops.

In flying the prototype from Diamond's Wiener Neustadt plant to the 2012 AERO Friedrichshafen aviation trade show, the aircraft achieved 16.6 mpg (14.2 litres/100 km) fuel efficiency, the result of improvements in cooling drag and aerodynamic drag made during its development.

The company originally intended to have the aircraft available for sale in July 2013 and expected to offer fly-by-wire controls as an option by 2014, but development was delayed and those dates were not met. The DA62 was European Aviation Safety Agency (EASA)-certified on 16 April 2015. By September 2015, the company was preparing to deliver the first production DA62s to customers the following month and was manufacturing the first aircraft destined for the United States market — the tenth DA52/DA62 to be built and the third production aircraft — for an appearance at that year's National Business Aviation Association Convention in November. American Federal Aviation Administration (FAA) certification was received on 23 February 2016 The FAA certification came ten months after EASA certification. At the 2016 AERO Friedrichshafen show, Diamond's CEO Christian Dries reported that production would be increased to 60–62 aircraft per year to meet strong demand.

The aircraft is available in two weight versions. The lower MTOW of the "European" version is to allow operators to avoid higher weight-based air traffic control user charges. The third row of seating and increased MTOW of the "US" version are available as factory options at extra cost. At the 2016 AERO Friedrichshafen, Christian Dries said a special version with an additional baggage belly pod was under consideration for the air charter market.

By April 2019 more than 120 DA62s had been delivered. Aircraft are built in both Austria and Canada.

In January 2023, it was announced that Aeromot will assemble DA62s in Brazil from kits supplied by Diamond Aircraft Canada, starting in 2025. The intention is to ramp-up production to 50 aircraft per year. The completed aircraft will be sold primarily in the south American market.

Operational history
Notable owners include German Leader of the Opposition Friedrich Merz, who, controversially flew to the wedding of Minister of Finance Christian Lindner in July 2022, claiming that the DA62 consumed less fuel than official limousines. Media fact checking disputed that claim, however conceded that the total consumption will probably be lower, if the travelling speed and detours - almost unavoidable for cars bound to roads - are factored into the comparison.

Variants 

DA52
Prototype, two built.
DA62
Five–seven seat production variant with an extra third window and larger horizontal stabilizer.
DA62 MPP
"Multi-Purpose Platform" variant intended for law enforcement, search and rescue, and surveillance operations.

Specifications (DA62)

References

External links 

 
 Official company first flight video
 AVWeb video about DA52 development shot at Aero 2012
 AVWeb video about the DA52 from May 2013
 AVWeb video about the DA62 from NBAA in November 2015
 We Fly: Diamond DA62 (Pilot Report)

2010s Austrian civil utility aircraft
DA52
Low-wing aircraft
T-tail aircraft
Aircraft first flown in 2012
Diesel-engined aircraft
Twin piston-engined tractor aircraft